English auxiliary verbs are a small set of English verbs, which include the English modal verbs and a few others. Although definitions vary, as generally conceived an auxiliary lacks inherent semantic meaning but instead modifies the meaning of another verb it accompanies. In English, verb forms are often classed as auxiliary on the basis of certain grammatical properties, particularly as regards their syntax. They also participate in subject–auxiliary inversion and negation by the simple addition of not after them.

History of the concept 
In English, the adjective auxiliary was "formerly applied to any formative or subordinate elements of language, e.g. prefixes, prepositions." As applied to verbs, its conception was originally rather vague and varied significantly.

Some historical examples 
The first English grammar, Pamphlet for Grammar by William Bullokar, published in 1586, does not use the term "auxiliary", but says, All other verbs are called verbs-neuters-un-perfect because they require the infinitive mood of another verb to express their signification of meaning perfectly: and be these, may, can, might or mought, could, would, should, must, ought, and sometimes, will, that being a mere sign of the future tense. (orthography has been modernized)In The life and opinions of Tristram Shandy, (1762) the narrator's father explains that "The verbs auxiliary we are concerned in here,..., are, am; was; have; had; do; did; make; made; suffer; shall; should; will; would; can; could; owe; ought; used; or is wont."

Wiseman's grammar from 1764 notes that most verbs cannot be conjugated through all their Moods and Tenses, without one of the following principal Verbs have and be. The first serves to conjugate the rest, by supplying the compound tenses of all Verbs both Regular and Irregular, whether Active, Passive, Neuter, or Impersonal, as may be seen in its own variation, &c. It goes on to include, along with have and be, do, may, can, shall, will as auxiliary verbs.

Fowler's grammar from 1857 has the following to say:AUXILIARY VERBS, or Helping Verbs, perform the same office in the conjugation of principal verbs which inflection does in the classical languages, though even in those languages the substantive verb is sometimes used as a helping verb... The verbs that are always auxiliary to others are, May, can, shall, must ; II. Those that are sometimes auxiliary and sometimes principal verbs are, Will, have, do, be, and let.The central core that each of these agree on are the modal auxiliary verbs may, can, and shall,  with most including also be, do, and have.

Auxiliary verbs as heads 
Modern grammars do not differ substantially in the list of auxiliary verbs, though they have refined the concept and often reconceptualized auxiliary verbs as the heads of a verb phrase, rather than as a subordinate element in it. This idea was first put forward by John Ross in 1969.

Many pedagogical grammars maintain the traditional idea that auxiliary verbs are subordinate elements, but many modern grammars such as The Cambridge Grammar of the English Language take auxiliaries to be heads. This is shown in the following tree diagram for the clause I can swim.

The clause has a subject noun phrase I and a head verb phrase, headed by the auxiliary verb can. The VP also has a complement clause, which has a head VP, with the head verb swim.

Auxiliary verbs vs lexical verbs 
The list of auxiliary verbs in Modern English, along with their inflected forms, is shown in the following table.

Some linguists consider membership in this syntactic class the defining property for English auxiliary verbs. The chief difference between this syntactic definition of "auxiliary verb" and the traditional definition given in the section above is that the syntactic definition includes forms of the verb be even when used simply as a copular verb (in sentences like I am hungry and It was a cat) where it does not accompany any other verb. 
In Modern English, auxiliary verbs are distinguished from lexical verbs by the NICER properties, as shown in the following table.

Negation 
Every case of clausal negation requires an auxiliary verb. Up until Middle English, lexical verbs could also participate in clausal negation, so a clause like Lee eats not apples would have been grammatical, but this is not longer possible in Modern English.

Inversion 
Although English is a subject–verb–object language, there are cases where a verb comes before the subject. This is called subject-auxiliary inversion because only auxiliary verbs participate in such constructions. Again, in Middle English, lexical verbs were no different, but in Modern English *eats Lee apples is ungrammatical.

Contraction of not 
Most English auxiliary verbs – but no lexical verbs – have a negative -n't morpheme. A small number of defective auxiliaries verbs don't take this morpheme. The auxiliary may has traditionally taken this morpheme, but this is now dated. Am becomes ain't only in non-standard English varieties; otherwise it has no negative form. Also, will has an irregular negative won't instead of the expected *willn't and shall has an irregular negative shan't instead of the expected (and now archaic)  *shalln't.

Ellipsis 
In a typical case, an auxiliary verb takes a non-finite clause complement. But this can be elided, as in the example above. Lexical verbs taking a non-finite clause complement don't allow this kind of ellipsis.

Rebuttal 
When two people are arguing, the second may deny a statement made by the first by using a stressed too or so. For example, having been told that they didn't do their homework, a child may reply I did too. This kind of rebuttal is impossible with lexical verbs.

The case of to 
Various linguists, including Geoff Pullum, Paul Postal and Richard Hudson, and Robert Fiengohas have suggested that to in cases like I want to go (not the preposition to) is a special case of an auxiliary verb with no tensed forms. Rodney Huddleston argues against this position in The Cambridge Grammar of the English Language, but Robert Levine counters these proposals. BetteLou Los calls Pullum's arguments that to is an auxiliary verb"compelling".

In terms of the NICER properties, examples like it's fine to not go shows that it allows negation. Inversion, contraction of not, and rebuttal would only apply to tensed forms, and to is argued to have none. It does allows ellipsis though: I don't want to, but rebuttal is not possible.

Auxiliaries as helping verbs
An auxiliary is traditionally understood as a verb that "helps" another verb by adding (only) grammatical information to it. On this basis, English auxiliaries include:
forms of the verb do (do, does, did) when used with another verb to form questions, negation, emphasis, etc. (see do-support);
forms of the verb have (have, has, had) when used to express perfect aspect;
forms of the verb be (am, are, is, was, were) when used to express progressive aspect or passive voice;
the modal verbs, used in a variety of meanings, principally relating to modality.

The following are examples of sentences containing the above types of auxiliary verbs:

Do you want tea? – do is an auxiliary accompanying the verb want, used here to form a question.
He had given his all. – had is an auxiliary accompanying the past participle given, expressing perfect aspect.
We are singing. – are is an auxiliary accompanying the present participle singing, expressing progressive aspect.
It was destroyed. – was is an auxiliary accompanying the past participle destroyed, expressing passive voice.
He can do it now. – can is a modal auxiliary accompanying the verb do.

However, the above understanding of auxiliaries is not the only one in the literature, particularly in the case of forms of the verb be, which may be called auxiliary even when not accompanying another verb. Other approaches to defining auxiliary verbs are described below.

Auxiliaries as verbs with special grammatical behavior
A group of English verbs with certain special grammatical (syntactic) properties distinguishes them from other verbs. This group consists mainly of verbs that are auxiliaries in the above sense – verbs that add purely grammatical meaning to other verbs – and thus some authors use the term "auxiliary verb" to denote precisely the verbs in this group. However, not all enumerations of English auxiliary verbs correspond exactly to the group of verbs having these grammatical properties. This group of verbs may also be referred to by other names, such as "special verbs".

Non-indicative and non-finite forms of the same verbs (when performing the same functions) are usually described as auxiliaries too, even though all or most of the distinctive syntactical properties do not apply to them specifically: be (as infinitive, imperative and subjunctive), being and been; when used in the expression of perfect aspect, have (as infinitive), having and had (as past participle).

Sometimes, non-auxiliary uses of have follow auxiliary syntax, as in Have you any ideas? and I haven't a clue. Other lexical verbs do not do this in modern English, although they did so formerly, and such uses as I know not... can be found in archaic English.

Meaning contribution
Forms of the verbs have and be, used as auxiliaries with a main verb's past participle and present participle respectively, express perfect aspect and progressive aspect. When forms of be are used with the past participle, they express passive voice. It is possible to combine any two or all three of these uses:
The room has been being cleaned for the past three hours.
Here the auxiliaries has, been and being (each followed by the appropriate participle type) combine to express perfect and progressive aspect and passive voice.

The auxiliary do (does, did) does not typically contribute any meaning (semantic or grammatical), except when used to add emphasis to an accompanying verb. This is called the emphatic mood in English: An example would be "I do go to work on time every day" (with intonational stress placed on do), compared to "I go to work on time every day." As an auxiliary, do mainly helps form questions, negations, etc., as described in the article on do-support.

Other auxiliaries – the modal verbs – contribute meaning chiefly in the form of modality, although some of them (particularly will and sometimes shall) express future time reference. Their uses are detailed at English modal verbs, and tables summarizing their principal meaning contributions can be found in the articles Modal verb and Auxiliary verb.
 
For more details on the uses of auxiliaries to express aspect, mood and time reference, see English clause syntax.

Contracted forms

Contractions are a common feature of English, used frequently in ordinary speech. In written English, contractions are used in mostly informal writing and sometimes in formal writing. They usually involve the elision of a vowel – an apostrophe being inserted in its place in written English – possibly accompanied by other changes. Many of these contractions involve auxiliary verbs and their negations, although not all of these have common contractions, and there are also certain other contractions not involving these verbs.

Contractions were first used in speech during the early 17th century and in writing during the mid 17th century when not lost its stress and tone and formed the contraction -n't. Around the same time, contracted auxiliaries were first used. When it was first used, it was limited in writing to only fiction and drama. In the 19th and 20th centuries, the use of contractions in writing spread outside of fiction such as personal letters, journalism, and descriptive texts.

Certain contractions tend to be restricted to less formal speech and very informal writing, such as John'd or Mary'd for "John/Mary would" (compare the personal pronoun forms I'd and you'd, which are much more likely to be encountered in relatively informal writing). This applies in particular to constructions involving consecutive contractions, such as wouldn't've for "would not have".

Contractions in English are generally not mandatory as in some other languages. It is almost always acceptable to use the uncontracted form, although in speech this may seem overly formal. This is often done for emphasis: I am ready! The uncontracted form of an auxiliary or copula must be used in elliptical sentences where its complement is omitted: Who's ready? I am! (not *I'm!).

Some contractions lead to homophony, which sometimes causes errors in writing. Confusion is particularly common between it's (for "it is/has") and the pronoun possessive its, and sometimes similarly between you're and your. For the confusion of have or -'ve with of (as in "" for would have), see Weak and strong forms in English.

Contractions of the type described here should not be confused with abbreviations, such as Ltd. for "Limited (company)". Contraction-like abbreviations, such as int'l for international, are considered abbreviations as their contracted forms cannot be pronounced in speech. Abbreviations also include acronyms and initialisms.

Negative form of am
Although there is no contraction for am not in standard English, there are certain colloquial or dialectal forms that may fill this role. These may be used in declarative sentences, whose standard form contains I am not, and in questions, with standard form am I not? In the declarative case the standard contraction I'm not is available, but this does not apply in questions, where speakers may feel the need for a negative contraction to form the analog of isn't it, aren't they, etc.

The following are sometimes used in place of am not in the cases described above:
The contraction ain't may stand for am not, among its other uses. For details see the next section, and the separate article on ain't.
The word amnae for "am not" exists in Scots, and has been borrowed into Scottish English by many speakers.
The contraction amn't (formed in the regular manner of the other negative contractions, as described above) is a standard contraction of am not in some varieties, mainly Hiberno-English (Irish English) and Scottish English. In Hiberno-English the question form (amn't I?) is used more frequently than the declarative I amn't. (The standard I'm not is available as an alternative to I amn't in both Scottish English and Hiberno-English.) An example appears in Oliver St. John Gogarty's impious poem The Ballad of Japing Jesus: "If anyone thinks that I amn't divine, / He gets no free drinks when I'm making the wine". These lines are quoted in James Joyce's Ulysses, which also contains other examples: "Amn't I with you? Amn't I your girl?" (spoken by Cissy Caffrey to Leopold Bloom in Chapter 15).
The contraction aren't, which in standard English represents are not, is a very common means of filling the "amn't gap" in questions: Aren't I lucky to have you around? Some twentieth-century writers described this usage as "illiterate" or awkward; today, however, it is reported to be "almost universal" among speakers of Standard English. Aren't as a contraction for am not developed from one pronunciation of "an't" (which itself developed in part from "amn't"; see the etymology of "ain't" in the following section). In non-rhotic dialects, "aren't" and this pronunciation of "an't" are homophones, and the spelling "aren't I" began to replace "an't I" in the early part of the 20th century, although examples of "aren't I" for "am I not" appear in the first half of the 19th century, as in "St. Martin's Day", from Holland-tide by Gerald Griffin, published in The Ant in 1827: "aren't I listening; and isn't it only the breeze that's blowing the sheets and halliards about?"

There is therefore no completely satisfactory first-person equivalent to aren't you? and isn't it? in standard English. The grammatical am I not? sounds stilted or affected, while aren't I? is grammatically dubious, and ain't I? is considered substandard. Nonetheless, aren't I? is the solution adopted in practice by most speakers.

Other colloquial contractions 
Ain't (described in more detail in the article ain't) is a colloquialism and contraction for "am not", "is not", "was not" "are not", "were not" "has not", and "have not". In some dialects "ain't" is also used as a contraction of "do not", "does not", "did not", "cannot/can not", "could not", "will not", "would not" and "should not". The usage of "ain't" is a perennial subject of controversy in English.

"Ain't" has several antecedents in English, corresponding to the various forms of "to be not" and "to have not".

"An't" (sometimes "a'n't") arose from "am not" (via "amn't") and "are not" almost simultaneously. "An't" first appears in print in the work of English Restoration playwrights. In 1695 "an't" was used as a contraction of "am not", and as early as 1696 "an't" was used to mean "are not". "An't" for "is not" may have developed independently from its use for "am not" and "are not". "Isn't" was sometimes written as "in't" or "en't", which could have changed into "an't". "An't" for "is not" may also have filled a gap as an extension of the already-used conjugations for "to be not".

"An't" with a long "a" sound began to be written as "ain't", which first appears in writing in 1749. By the time "ain't" appeared, "an't" was already being used for "am not", "are not", and "is not". "An't" and "ain't" coexisted as written forms well into the nineteenth century.

"Han't" or "ha'n't", an early contraction for "has not" and "have not", developed from the elision of the "s" of "has not" and the "v" of "have not". "Han't" also appeared in the work of English Restoration playwrights. Much like "an't", "han't" was sometimes pronounced with a long "a", yielding "hain't". With H-dropping, the "h" of "han't" or "hain't" gradually disappeared in most dialects, and became "ain't". "Ain't" as a contraction for "has not"/"have not" appeared in print as early as 1819. As with "an't", "hain't" and "ain't" were found together late into the nineteenth century.

Some other colloquial and dialect contractions are described below:
"Bain't" or "bain't", apparently a contraction of "be not", is found in a number of works employing eye dialect, including J. Sheridan Le Fanu's Uncle Silas. It is also found in a ballad written in Newfoundland dialect.
"Don't" is a standard English contraction of "do not". However, for some speakers "don't" also functions colloquially as a contraction of "does not": Emma? She don't live here anymore. This is considered incorrect in standard English.
"Hain't", in addition to being an antecedent of "ain’t", is a contraction of "has not" and "have not" in some dialects of English, such as Appalachian English. It is reminiscent of "hae" ("have") in Lowland Scots. In dialects that retain the distinction between "hain't" and "ain't", "hain't" is used for contractions of "to have not" and "ain't" for contractions of "to be not". In other dialects, "hain't" is used either in place of, or interchangeably with "ain't". "Hain't" is seen for example in Chapter 33 of Mark Twain's The Adventures of Huckleberry Finn: I hain't come back—I hain't been GONE. ("Hain't" is to be distinguished from "haint", a slang term for ghost (i.e., a "haunt"), famously used in the novel To Kill a Mockingbird.)

Contractions and inversion

In cases of subject–auxiliary inversion, particularly in the formation of questions, the negative contractions can remain together as a unit and invert with the subject, thus acting as if they were auxiliary verbs in their own right. For example:
He is going. → Is he going? (regular affirmative question formation)
He isn't going. → Isn't he going? (negative question formation; isn't inverts with he)
One alternative is not to use the contraction, in which case only the verb inverts with the subject, while the not remains in place after it:
He is not going. → Is he not going?
Note that the form with isn't he is no longer a simple contraction of the fuller form (which must be is he not, and not *is not he).

Another alternative to contract the auxiliary with the subject, in which case inversion does not occur at all:
He's not going. → He's not going?
Some more examples:
Why haven't you washed? / Why have you not washed?
Can't you sing? / Can you not sing? (the full form cannot is redivided in case of inversion)
Where wouldn't they look for us? / Where would they not look for us?
The contracted forms of the questions are more usual in informal English. They are commonly found in tag questions. For the possibility of using aren't I (or other dialectal alternatives) in place of the uncontracted am I not, see Contractions representing am not above.

The same phenomenon sometimes occurs in the case of negative inversion:
Not only doesn't he smoke, ... / Not only does he not smoke, ...

Notes

References
Adger, D. 2003. Core Syntax. Oxford, UK: Oxford University Press.
Allerton, D. 2006. Verbs and their Satellites. In Handbook of English Linguistics. Aarts & MacMahon (eds.). Blackwell.
Bresnan, J. 2001. Lexical-Functional Syntax. Malden, MA: Blackwell Publishers.
Crystal, D. 1997. A Dictionary of Linguistics and Phonetics, 4th edition. Oxford, UK: Blackwell Publishers.
Culicover, P. 2009. Natural Language Syntax. Oxford, UK: Oxford University Press.
Engel, U. 1994. Syntax der deutschen Sprache, 3rd edition. Berlin: Erich Schmidt Verlag.
Eroms, H.-W. 2000. Syntax der deutschen Sprache. Berlin: de Gruyter.
Finch, G. 2000. Linguistic Terms and Concepts. New York: St. Martin's Press.
Fowler's Modern English Usage. 1996. Revised third edition. Oxford, UK: Oxford University Press.
Jurafsky, D. and J. Martin. 2000. Speech and Language Processing. Dorling Kindersley (India): Pearson Education, Inc. / Upper Saddle River, N.J.: Pearson Prentice Hall, 2009.
Kroeger, P. 2004. Analyzing Syntax: A lexical-functional approach. Cambridge, UK: Cambridge University Press.
Lewis, M. The English Verb 'An Exploration of Structure and Meaning' . Language Teaching Publications. 
Osborne, T. and T. Groß 2012. Constructions are catenae: Construction Grammar meets Dependency Grammar. Cognitive Linguistics 23, 1, 165–216.
Palmer, F. R., A Linguistic Study of the English Verb, Longmans, 1965.
Radford. A. 1997. Syntactic Theory and the Structure of English: A minimalist approach. Cambridge, UK: Cambridge University Press.
Radford, A. 2004. English Syntax: An introduction. Cambridge, UK: Cambridge University Press.
Rowlett, P. 2007. The Syntax of French. Cambridge, UK: Cambridge University Press.
Sag, I. and T. Wasow. 1999. Syntactic Theory: A formal introduction. Stanford, CA: CSLI Publications.
Tesnière, L. 1959. Élements de syntaxe structurale. Paris: Klincksieck.
Warnant, L. 1982. Structure syntaxique du français. Librairie Droz.
Warner, Anthony R., English Auxiliaries, Cambridge Univ. Press, 1993.

External links

Auxiliary
Slang
English modal and auxiliary verbs